The Tanzer 10.5 is a Canadian sailboat, that was first built in 1983. The boat was developed from the 1980 Dick Carter designed Tanzer 10, with contributions from Johann Tanzer.

Production
The boat was built by Tanzer Industries Limited in Dorion, Quebec. The company entered bankruptcy in 1986 and production had ended by then.

Design

The Tanzer 10.5 is a small recreational keelboat, built predominantly of fibreglass, with wood trim. It has a masthead sloop rig, a transom and skeg-hung rudder, wheel steering and a fixed fin keel or optionally a swing keel as the Tanzer 10 LK. The boat displaces  and carries  of ballast.

It has a pilothouse and inside steering. The pilothouse is access ed from the cockpit down a short ladder. The pilothouse has wrap-around windows and a helm position to starboard, with a chart table located outboard. Aft of the pilothouse is the head with a shower. Next to that is the galley, with a three-burner propane stove and oven. The main cabin is two steps down from the pilothouse and features a dinette table with seating for eight people. The table can be converted to a double berth. In the bow are two separate berths, with the starboard one above the port one. There are seven deck hatches and three opening ports for ventilation.

Sails include a self-tending jib, 110% and 150% genoas, as well as a poleless spinnaker of  intended only for cruising use.

Operational history

In a review Michael McGoldrick wrote, "The Tanzer 10.5 (a 34 footer) was designed with a number of very interesting and innovative features. It has a retractable ballasted keel. Unlike many boats with a swing keel arrangement, the Tanzer 10.5's keel fills-in the entire keel house opening when it is in its lowered position. This means its performance should come very close to that of a true fixed keel. (While conceived as a boat with a retractable keel, it was possible to order it with a standard fin keel or fixed shoal draft keel.) Although the Tanzer 10.5 looks very much like a sleek sailboat, it actually has a pilot house with an interior steering station. Likewise, although the Tanzer 10.5 looks like it is an aft-cockpit boat, it is really a quasi mid-cockpit sailboat. It has a cabin located aft of the cockpit, which is connected to the main cabin by a small passage way. The innovative design of the Tanzer 10.5 does have a few drawbacks. For example, it has a small cockpit for a 34 footer, and because of the complexities of the keel lifting mechanism, this part of the boat is prone to problems."

Variants
Tanzer 10.5
The boat has a PHRF racing average handicap of 162.
Tanzer 10.5 LK
The keel is hydraulically raised and its housing is located inside both the main cabin and the pilothouse. The boat has a PHRF racing average handicap of 153 with a high of 153 and low of 156.

See also
List of sailing boat types

References

External links

Keelboats
1980s sailboat type designs
Sailing yachts
Sailboat type designs by Dick Carter
Sailboat type designs by Johann Tanzer
Sailboat types built by Tanzer Industries